Fire in the Thatch is a 1946 detective novel E.C.R. Lorac, the pen name of the British writer Edith Caroline Rivett. It is the twenty seventh in her long-running series featuring Chief Inspector MacDonald of Scotland Yard. Originally published by Collins Crime Club, it was reissued in 2018 by the British Library Publishing as part of a group of crime novels from the Golden Age of Detective Fiction.

Synopsis
The novel is set in South Devon in the last year of the Second World War. Colonel St Cyres, a landowner and farmer of Devon Cattle, rents a thatched cottage on his estate to a new tenant. Recently discharged from the Navy the new arrival plans to operate as a market gardener. This is greatly to the annoyance of his daughter-in-law June, a spoilt Mayfair woman living with him while her husband is in a Japanese prisoner of war camp. June had hoped that her friend Tommy Gressingham would take the property, as part of his plans to build a luxury hotel on the site. When the new tenant is found dead in the burned-out cottage, MacDonald is called in from Scotland Yard to investigate the possibility of murder.

References

Bibliography
 Cooper, John & Pike, B.A. Artists in Crime: An Illustrated Survey of Crime Fiction First Edition Dustwrappers, 1920-1970. Scolar Press, 1995.
 Hubin, Allen J. Crime Fiction, 1749-1980: A Comprehensive Bibliography. Garland Publishing, 1984.
 Nichols, Victoria & Thompson, Susan. Silk Stalkings: More Women Write of Murder. Scarecrow Press, 1998.
 Reilly, John M. Twentieth Century Crime & Mystery Writers. Springer, 2015.

1946 British novels
British mystery novels
Novels by E.C.R. Lorac
Novels set in London
Novels set in Devon
British detective novels
Collins Crime Club books